Richard Finlay Koecher (March 30, 1926 – February 4, 2020), nicknamed "Highpockets", was an American professional baseball pitcher, who appeared in seven games over three seasons with the Philadelphia Phillies in the major leagues from 1946 to 1948. He died on February 4, 2020, at the age of 93.

References

External links

1926 births
2020 deaths
Baseball players from Philadelphia
Major League Baseball pitchers
Philadelphia Phillies players